A shaligram, or shaligrama shila, is a particular variety of stone collected from riverbed or banks of the Kali Gandaki, a tributary of the Gandaki River in Nepal. It is used as a non-anthropomorphic representation of Vishnu by Hindus. They are typically fossils of ammonite shells from the Devonian-Cretaceous period, 400 to 66 million years ago. The fossils (also called Astamurti) are considered holy by Hindus. The Shankha (conch shell) resembles symbols associated with Vishnu.

Legends

According to the Devi Bhagavata Purana, Brahmavaivarta Purana, and Shiva Purana, shilagrama shilas originated due to the following chain of events.

A king named Vrishadhvaja had been cursed by Surya to endure poverty, due to his reluctance to worship any deity other than Shiva. To regain their lost prosperity, his grandsons Dharmadhvaja and Kusadhvaja performed austerities to appease the goddess Lakshmi, the goddess of prosperity. Pleased with the austerities, she granted them prosperity, and the blessing of her being born as their daughters. Accordingly, Lakshmi incarnated as Vedavati, the daughter of Kusadhvaja and Tulasi, the daughter of Dharmadhvaja. Tulasi went to Badarikashrama to perform austerities in order to gain Vishnu as her husband, but was informed by Brahma that she would not get Vishnu as her husband in that life, and would have to marry the danava named Shankhachuda.

In his previous birth, Shankhachuda was Sudama, an attendant of Krishna, a manifestation of Vishnu residing in Goloka. He had been created out of his body, and was cursed by Radha to be born as a danava. As a result, Shankhachuda was virtuous and pious by nature, and was devoted to Vishnu. He married Tulasi on the command of Brahma, as per the rules of the Gandharva marriage. After Shankhachuda's marriage, the danavas, under his leadership, waged a battle against their natural enemies, the devas, in which they won due to merit of Shankhachuda's virtue. The devas were subsequently driven out of Svarga by the victorious danavas.

Demoralised and defeated, the devas approached Vishnu, who told them that Shankhachuda was destined to be killed by Shiva. On being requested by the devas, Shiva, along with his attendants and the devas, waged a battle against the danavas, led by Shankhachuda. However, neither side was able to outpower the other. An unembodied voice told Shiva that by the boon of Brahma, Shankhachuda was invincible in combat as long as he wore his armour, and his wife's chastity was not violated.

Hence, Vishnu, assuming the form of an old Brahmin, asked Shankhachuda his armour while begging alms. Shankhachuda donated his armour to him. When he was busy fighting with Shiva, Vishnu, wearing Shankhachuda's armour, assumed the form of Shankhachuda, and cohabited with Tulasi. Thus, Tulasi's chastity was broken, and Shankhachuda was killed by Shiva's trishula, thereby reliving Sudama from the curse.

At the moment of Shankhachuda's death, Tulasi became suspicious that the man who was with her at that time was not Shankhachuda. When she discovered that it was Vishnu who had deceived her, she cursed him to become a stone, as she believed that he had been emotionless like a stone in accomplishing the death of his devotee, Shankhachuda, and stealing her chastity, when she was also his devotee. Vishnu consoled Tulasi by stating that it was the result of her austerities performed in the past in order to gain him as her husband, and that she would again become his wife upon casting off her body. Thus, Lakshmi cast off the body of Tulasi, and assumed a new form (which became known by the name of Tulasi). The discarded body of Tulasi was transformed into the Gandaki river, and from her hairs emerged the tulasi shrub. Vishnu, on being cursed by Tulasi, assumed the form of a large rocky mountain known as shaligrama, on the banks of the Gandaki river where vajrakita, a type of worm having teeth as strong as the vajra, carved out various markings on his body.

History
Historically, the use of shaligrama shilas in worship can be traced to the time of Adi Shankara through the latter's works. Specifically, his commentary to the verse 1.6.1 in Taittiriya Upanishad, and his commentary to the verse 1.3.14 of the Brahma Sutras, suggest that the use of shaligrama shila in the worship of Vishnu has been a well-known Hindu practice. A good number of false shaligrama shilas, too, remain in circulation.

The statue of Vishnu in the Padmanabhaswamy Temple of Thiruvananthapuram and Badrinath Temple of Garhwal region, and that of Krishna in Krishna Matha of Udupi and Radha Raman Temple of Vrindavana are also believed to be made from shaligrama shilas.

Sources

Shaligrama shilas are obtained from the area of Nepal known as Shalagrama kshetra, which lies on the basin of the Kaligandaki river between Damodara kunda situated south of the mountain peak named Damodara Himal near Dhaulagiri (which can approached after trekking for a few days from Muktinath) in Mustang district in the north to Ruru Kshetra (referred to as the hermitage of Sage Pulaha in Varaha Purana) in the south.

Configurations

Quoting from sources like Viramitrodaya, Chaturvarga-chintamani, Matsyasukta, Vaishvanara Samhita, Puranasamgraha etc. the Pranatoshani Tantra cites the following varieties of shaligrama shilas on the basis of shape, colour, features of the chakra (imprint of the ammonite shell present on the outer surface or inside the stone, resembling Sudarshana Chakra, the main weapon of Vishnu) and mukha/vadana/dvara (a large aperture resembling an open mouth through which the chakra present within the stone can be seen from outside) and distinct markings like the vanamala (a linear white line running throughout the body of the stone, resembling a garland) 

● Keshava: i) Marked with a single chakra, a vanamala and four bindus (circular markings present on the outer surface) of golden hue arranged like a square. ii) Marked with a shankha and chakra on the lower middle portion. Grants prosperity and fulfilment of all desires on being worshipped.

● Hayagriva: i) Blue in colour at the top, shaped like an elephant-goad or the head of a horse, marked with a linear mark present near the chakra and several bindus. ii) Marked with five linear marks, other characteristics being the same before. iii) Marked with a single chakra and a marking resembling a banner. iv) Has both yellow and red colours on its surface, endowed with two chakras, marked with markings resembling ear-rings and gems on the sides, shaped like an elephant-goad or lotus-bud. v) Shaped like a lotus-bud while the mukha shaped like the head of a horse, and marked with a marking resembling a rosary. vi) Green in colour, marked with a single chakra, the left side is elevated like that of a kapinjala bird. Grants knowledge, prosperity and wordly enjoyment on being worshipped.

● Parameshthin: i) Presence of a hole (which does not reaches the other side of the stone, otherwise the stone would be unfit for worship) at the top, has a single chakra, marked with the markings resembling a lotus and several bindus. ii) White in colour, has a single chakra and markings resembling a lotus, shaped like a snake's hood/pearl necklace/sphere, the top is perforated and hard. iii) Reddish in colour, circular in shape with a single chakra and linear mark, perforated and hard. iv) Round in shape, yellow in colour with a hole at the top. v) Red/white in colour while the top surface is yellowish and perforated, marked with a single chakra and markings resembling a lotus. Grants enjoyment and liberation on being worshipped.

● Hiranyagarbha : i) The colour is yellow like that of honey and slightly elongated in shape, has several golden linear marks on the body with a crystal-like glow and shaped like the round moon. ii) Black in colour, round in shape, the vadana is glazed, marked with a single chakra and marking resembling srivatsa (a triangular mark on Vishnu's chest) on a of the top surface. Grants prosperity and increase in progeny on being worshipped.

● Chaturbhuja : The colour is blue like that of a rain cloud. It is round in shape and marked with four chakras. Grants fearlessness on being worshipped.

● Gadadhara : Circular in shape, yellow in colour, the chakra is situated towards the left, the middle part is marked with three linear marks, markings resembling a banner, a vajra and elephant-goad are present on it.

● Narayana :i) Shyama (dark colour of lighter tone) in complexion, the chakra is situated at middle portion, marked with a long linear mark, the right side is perforated. ii) The vadana is situated at the middle of the body, within which lies the chakra at the front, endowed with markings resembling ornaments like ear-rings, bracelets and necklaces. Grants all sorts of success on being worshipped.
Lakshminarayana : i) Endowed with a single vadana, four chakras and a vanamala. ii) Circular in shape, the colour is yellow/blue like a fresh rain-cloud, the vadana is glazed and situated towards the left side within which lie four chakras, endowed with markings resembling a banner, a vajra and an elephant-goad, possesses vanamala, the top is raised and has some bindus on its surface. Grants enjoyment, liberation, fulfilment of all desires, four aims of human life (dharma, artha, kama, moksha), redemption from sins on being worshipped.
Naranarayana : The chakra is red in colour while the body is green like the tamala tree with patches of golden colouration.
Rupinarayana : Markings resembling pestle, gada, shankha are present alongside a single chakra while another marking resembling a bow is situated near the vadana.

● Madhava : With a colour like that of honey, marked with a gada and shankha, the chakra is situated at the middle and is glazed. Grants liberation on being worshipped.

● Govinda : i) Black in colour, shining in appearance, endowed with a single chakra alongside markings resembling a gada on that right side and that resembling a mountain on the left. ii) Black in colour, not much large in size, the central portion is raised upwards, endowed with a large vadana marked with five chakras situated towards the left

● Vishnu : Black in colour, possesses a large chakra, shaped like a gada, a linear mark is present on the top surface near the vadana. Grants liberation on being worshipped.

● Madhusudhana : Golden in colour with shining appearance, has a single chakra and endowed with markings resembling a lotus and a shankha. Destroys enemies on being worshipped.

● Trivikrama : Shyama in colour, triangular in shape with shining appearance, has one or two chakras along with some bindus on the left-side and a linear mark on the right-side . Grants wealth on being worshipped.

● Shridhara : i) The shape is as round like the kadamba flower, endowed with vanamala and five linear marks at the top surface and sides. ii) Green in colour, round in shape with a flat upper surface, endowed with a single glazed chakra and markings resembling a lotus in the middle. iii) Small in size, has two chakras and a vanamala. iv) Glittering like a gem, endowed with a single chakra, vanamala, markings resembling a lotus/banner and another resembling an elephant-goad near the vadana. Grants prosperity to householders on being worshipped.

● Hrishikesha : Shaped like a half moon with a single chakra and also with markings resembling the hair of a boar.

● Padmanabha : Reddish in colour, endowed with a semicircular chakra and markings resembling a lotus and hairs of a mane. Causes poverty and sorrow, hence should not be worshipped.

● Damodara : i) Big in size, the colour is as green as durva grass with a small chakra situated in the middle, a small vadana and a single yellowish linear mark in the middle ii) Endowed with two chakras and a cracked outer surface. Grants auspiciousness on being worshipped.

● Sudarshana : i) Green in colour with gliterring appearance, the chakra and markings resembling a gada are situated on the left side while linear markings arranged like a lotus are found on the right side. ii) Black in colour, shaped like a lotus, endowed with a single chakra, a large vadana and lowered middle portion. Destroys all sins and grants results of all types of worship the on being worshipped.

● Vasudeva : White in colour, endowed with a single or two chakras at the dwara. Fulfills all desires on being worshipped.

● Pradyumna : i) Yellow in colour, has a small chakra and markings resembling a makara on the sides and top surface, endowed with many holes. ii) The colour is as blue as rain-clouds, has a small chakra and small mukha and many holes. Grants prosperity and happiness to householders on being worshipped.

● Aniruddha : i) Blue in colour, round in shape and glazed, has markings resembling a lotus at the top surface and three linear marks near the dvara. ii) Black in colour with a beautifully shaped dwara and having a chakra near the centre, another on the sides and a small chakra at the top surface. iii) Yellow in colour, round in shape. Grants happiness to householders on being worshipped.

● Purushottama : i) Golden in colour with a chakra at the middle portion and a bigger chakra at the front. ii) The colour is as yellow as the atasi flower and endowed with many bindus. iii) With mukhas on all directions (traditionally numbered to ten). Increases prosperity and grants enjoyment and liberation on being worshipped.

● Adhokshaja : Dark black in colour with patches of brown, circular in shape, endowed with a single chakra and red linear marks, maybe large or small in size. Grants auspiciousness to worshippers on being worshipped.

● Achyuta : Has four chakras on right and left sides and two red markings resembling ear-rings at the mukha, also marked with markings resembling shankha, gada, bow, arrow, pestle, banner, white umbrella and a red elephant-goad.

● Upendra : Green in colour with glittering appearance, has a glazed body with one or more chakras on the sides.

● Janardana : Has two dwaras; one on the eastern side and another on the western side, and four chakras; two on the top surface and other two in the middle. Grants prosperity and destroys enemies on being worshipped.

● Lakshmijanardana : The colour is as blue as rain-clouds with one dwara and four chakras.

● Hari : Green in colour, round in shape with one mukha at the top, the lower portion is marked with bindus. Fulfills all desires on being worshipped.

● Ananta: i) Marked with markings resembling the hood of a snake, has 20 red chakras, 14 dwaras and many bindus, has different colours on its bod. ii) The colour is as blue as a rain-cloud, circular in shape, has 27 chakras. Grants four aims of human life and results of all types of worship on being worshipped.

● Yogeshwara : Has a shivalinga like structure on its top surface. Grants redemption from the great sin of brahmahatya on being worshipped.

● Pundarikaksha : Has markings resembling a pair of eyes/lotuses on the left or top surface or sides. Can bring the entire world under control of the worshipper on being worshipped.

● Chaturmukha : Has four linear marks on the sides, and two chakras on the middle portion of the body.

● Yajnamurthi : Has both yellow and red colours on its surface, with a small dwara and two chakras; one at the middle and other on the right side.

● Dattatreya : i) Has white, red and black patches and markings resembling a rosary on the top surface. (Some versions state red and yellow colours)

● Shishumara : Long in shape, with a deep triangular opening and having one or two chakras on the front side and another on the back side. Grants all sorts of success on being worshipped.

● Hamsa : Shaped like a bow having both blue and white colours on its surface and has a chakra and markings resembling a lotus. Grants only salvation on being worshipped.

● Parahamsa : The colour is blue like the throat of a peacock, with a glazed body and round dwara within which lies a single chakra and a glittering patch resembling the sun on the right side of the chakra. There are also two linear marks forming the shape of a boar on the body. Grants four aims of human life on being worshipped.

● Lakshmipati : Black in colour while the sides or the front portion is blue like a peacock's throat, has a small chakra and large vadana. Grants prosperity and wealth on being worshipped.

● Garudadhvajalakshmipati : Round in shape, has golden marks resembling horns and hoofs on the body and a smooth chakra with black linear marks on it.

● Batapatrashayin : Round in shape with white, copper-red and blue colours on its surface, has a single vadana in the middle, four chakras and three bindus, markings resembling a shankha and a lotus lie to the left and right side of the chakra respectively.

● Vishvambhara : Has 20 chakras on the body.

● Vishvarupa : Circular in shape, has one or five dwaras and many chakras. Bestows children and grandchildren on being worshipped.

● Pitambara : Round like the udder of a cow or a human breast, has a single chakra. Grants happiness on being worshipped.

● Chakrapani : Round in shape and glazed, with a small chakra and many other prints.

● Saptavirashrava : Round in shape with a small chakra and several golden bindus all over the body. Increases all sorts of prosperity on being worshipped.

● Jagadyoni: A single red chakra is present within the dwara. Grants auspiciousness on being worshipped.

● Bahurupin : With multiple mukhas and single chakra alongside markings resembling a shankha present inside. Grants salvation on being worshipped.

● Harihara : Has four dwaras and two chakras with a shivanabhi (a special form of shivalinga) like structure on its top surface. Grants prosperity and happiness on being worshipped.

● Swayambhu : Blue in colour with a long and big mukha, and having the body encircled by linear marks. Grants only salvation on being worshipped.

● Shivanarayana : Has two mukhas and chakras. Destroys wealth, property and progeny, hence should not be worshipped.

● Shankaranarayana : Has a shivanabhi like structure either sideways or left side or right side.

● Pitamaha : Has four different dwaras with a chakra in each of them.

● Naramurti : The colour is yellow like the atasi flower with markings resembling a sacred thread on the sides.

● Shesha : Printed with linear marks forming the coiled body of a snake. Although red in colour, it is not considered inauspicious.

● Pralambaghna : Red in colour with the markings resembling the coiled body and hood of a snake. Causes death, hence should not be worshipped.

● Suryamurti : Has 12 different chakras either on the body surface or inside the dwara. Destroys illnesses on being worshipped.

● Haiheya : Has one mukha and multiple markings resembling hoods, out of which two are found on the right side of the dwara, shaped like a lotus petal with a golden mark resembling an arc. Grants all sorts of success on being worshipped.

● Vishnupanjara : Printed with several linear marks.

● Garuda : i) Shaped like a lotus with three marks one above the other the central line being longer, has four chakras. ii) Printed with markings resembling a pair of wings and having two, three or four golden linear marks on his body, green, blue or white in colour. Destroys all sins on being worshipped.

● Matsya : i) Elongated in shape, the colour is like gold/bell-metal, and marked with three bindus. ii) Elonhated in shape resembling a fish, green in colour with crystal-like glow, endowed with two chakras at the middle portion and three bindus. iii) Has three elongated dwaras each possessing a chakra while another chakra is situated at the posterior end shaped like the tail of a fish, the right side is shaped like a cart, the left side has a linear mark. iv) Has a long dwara at the right side, endowed with three bindus, a single chakra and markings resembling a shankha and lotus
v) Shaped like a fish and a has markings resembling an elongated fish. Grants enjoyment, liberation, fulfilment of all desires and auspiciousness on being worshipped.

● Kurma : i) Shaped like a tortoise with the eastern side elevated. ii) Green in colour, round in shape resembling a tortoise, the top surface being elevated and endowed with red markings resembling Kaustubha, five circular markings resembling the sun and a chakra. iii) Endowed with structures resembling the feet of a bed on the sides. iv) Endowed with a single chakra, three golden bindus and markings resembling a shankha and a lotus. v) Elongated in shape with the mukha extending from left to right side, and endowed with five circular markings resembling the sun. vi) Triangular in shape like the inflorescence of a snuhi plant with chakras on both sides. vii) Round in shape resembling a tortoise, has both blue and red colours on its surface, has a long dwara and two chakras imprinted sideways at the middle portion of the body.  Fulfills all sorts of desires and increases progeny on being worshipped.

● Varaha : i) Blue in colour, big in size, and printed with odd number of chakras and three linear marks. ii) Endowed with even number of chakras, of which at least one is situated on the right side, and vanamala. This last variety is called Lakshmi-Varaha. Grants enjoyment and liberation on being worshipped.

● Narasimha : Has a very large mukha, two chakras and linear marks resembling the mane of a lion. Creates detachment in the mind of the worshipper on being worshipped.
Kapilanarasimha : Has three or five bindus, two large chakras in the middle, prominent linear marks, teeth-like projections in the large mukha, circular in shape and tawny in colour like jaggery or lac. Grants liberation, victory in combat, fulfilment of all desires, redemption from sins on being worshipped by a celibate, otherwise causes difficulties and pain.
Lakshminarasimha : Has a large mukha, two chakras at the left side, three or five bindus and a vanamala. Grants happiness, liberation and enjoyment to householders on being worshipped.
Vidarananarasimha : Has a very large mukha endowed with teeth-like projections and two chakras inside it. Causes fear and inflammation of residence on not being worshipped by a celibate.
Sarvatomukhanarasimha : Golden in colour, has multiple mukhas and seven chakras.
Patalanarasimha : Has multiple dwaras, multiple chakras (three at the dwara and ten at the sides) and multiple colours. Grants nectar of immortality to monks on being worshipped.
Akashanarasimha : Has a large mukha and an elevated chakra in the middle. To be worshipped only by monks.
Rakshasanarasimha : Golden in colour, has a large mukha and multiple holes. Causes inflammation of residence, hence should not be worshipped.
Jihvanarasimha : Has two large mukhas, two chakras and an elevated front. Causes poverty, hence should not be worshipped.
Adhomukhanarasimha : Has three chakras, one inside, other on the top surface and another on the sides. Grants liberation on being worshipped.
Jwalanarasimha : Has a small mukha, two chakras and a vanamala. Grants freedom from the world on being worshipped.
Mahanarasimha : Has two chakras and very beautiful, prominent linear marks.

● Vamana :
i) Round in shape like the kadamba flower, small in size and marked with five linear marks. ii) Small in size with glittering appearance, the shape is circular or triangular like the inflorescence of the snuhi flower, has a chakra on both top and bottom surface with markings resembling the Brahminy kite beside the chakra. iii) Not very small in size, has a single prominent glazedchakra at the centre. iv) The colour is yellow like the atasi flower with an elevated top surface, white bindus at the mukha and an indistinct chakra. v) The colour is blue like the rain-cloud, round like the bilva fruit or seeds of the jujube fruit in shape, has two chakras, a vanamala and a small mukha. This last variety is called Dadhivamana. Grants fulfilment of all desires, happiness, prosperity; increase in property, progeny and wealth of householders on being worshipped.

● Parashurama : Yellow or black in colour and marked with markings resembling an axe, has a chakra on either left or right side and markings resembling teeth, either at the top surface or on the sides. Prevents untimely death on being worshipped.

● Ramachandra : The colour is green like the durva grass, endowed with a single chakra, markings resembling a staff on the top surface and two linear marks on the sides.
Ranarama : Neither too large nor too small in size, circular in shape, endowed with two chakras and markings resembling an arrow and a quiver.
Rajarajeshwara : Neither too large nor too small in size, circular in shape, endowed with two or seven chakras and perforated with holes that appear to have been created by arrows, has markings resembling an umbrella, an arrow and a quiver. Grants wealth and kingship on being worshipped.
Sitarama : The colour is blue like a rain-cloud, has one or two dwaras, four chakras out of which one is situated at the left side, a vanamala and markings resembling a bow, an arrow, an elephant-goad, a banner, an umbrella and a chamara (fly-whisk made of yak-tail hair). Grants victory and prosperity on being worshipped.
Dashakanthakulantakarama : Oval in shape like a chicken's egg, green in colour, the top surface is elevated, has two linear marks at the dwara and a marking resembling a bow at the sides.
Virarama : Has a glazed chakra appearing like a lotus filament and markings resembling a bow, an arrow, a quiver, an ear-ring and a garland. Grants prosperity on being worshipped.
Vijayarama : Has a single chakra appearing like a lotus filament, endowed with red bindus, a gaping vadana and markings resembling a bow, an arrow and a quiver.
Ramamurti : Has a single chakra within the vadana, black in colour. Grants the ability to compose poetry on being worshipped.
Dustarama : The colour is blue like a rain-cloud, has markings resembling a bow and an arrow on the top surface and that resembling hooves at the sides.

● Krishna : i) Black in colour, endowed with a single chakra at the dwara and a vanamala. ii) Has yellow patches, the dwara is situated at the middle, the top surface resembles a tortoise shell, endowed with yellow bindus at the sides. Grants wealth, crops, happiness and redemption from sins on being worshipped.
Balakrisha : Has a long mukha and bindus on both top and bottom surface. Grants progeny and prosperity on being worshipped.
Gopala : Deep black in colour, large in size, endowed with two chakras, a vanamala, triangular markings resembling shrivatsa, white teeth-like structure at the sides within the mukha resembling a smile. Grants property, crops and wealth on being worshipped.
Madanagopala : A Gopala shila endowed with additional attributes - markings resembling full-bloomed lotuses on the sides, a garland and an ear-ring. Grants children, grandchildren, wealth and control over the world on being worshipped.
Santanagopala : A Gopala shila whose mukha is shaped like a half-moon. Increases progeny on being worshipped.
Govardhanagopala : Circular in shape, the front portion is lowered, endowed with bindus of silvery hue alongside markings resembling a staff and a garland on the sides, another resembling a venu at the mukha and a long linear mark on the right side. Grants fulfilment of all desires, destruction of all enemies, redemption from all sins, cattle and crops on being worshipped. 
Lakshmigopala : A Gopala shila which is oval in shape like a chicken's egg, endowed with markings resembling a venu, an ear-ring and a country plough. Grants progeny, spouse, property, enjoyment and liberation on being worshipped.
Kaliyamardana : The sides are large and endowed with golden linear marks and three small bindus. Grants destruction of enemies, progeny and wealth on being worshipped.
Syamantahari : The colour is white like the blade of a sword, has a large chakra, the top surface is endowed with a vanamala and triangular markings resembling shrivatsa. Increases progeny and fame on being worshipped.
Chanuramardana : Green in colour with two red bindus, endowed with linear markings on both left and right sides, giving a resemblance to a fist. Destroys all enemies on being worshipped.
Kamsamardana : Blue in colour, having a different colour either at the front or on a rear side.

● Sankarshana : Red in colour, has two chakras joined with each other on the top side, the eastern side is perforated. Grants happiness to householders on being worshipped.
Balabhadra : Marked with seven chakras. Grants children and grandchildren on being worshipped.
Balarama : Has five linear marks on the top side and markings resembling a bow and an arrow on the rear sides. Grants progeny on being worshipped.

● Buddha : Has a very small mukha but without any chakra. It is also called Nivita (hidden) Buddha. Grants the ultimate position (parama pada) on being worshipped.

● Kalki : i) The colour is black like that of a bee, has six chakras and markings resembling a sword/dagger over the mukha on the top surface. ii) Shaped like the face of a horse and marked with three chakras. Destroys all evil caused by kaliyuga on being worshipped.

More detailed classification is provided in the Meru Tantra and in the book Shalagrama Kosha compiled by S. K. Ramachandra Rao from a manuscript named Shalagrama Pariksha written by a Telugu brahmin named Anupasimha and unpublished sections of the Sritattvanidhi dealing with shaligrama shilas.

Use

Shaligrama shilas are used as non-anthropomorphic representations of Vishnu alongside Dvaravati shilas, similar to the use of yantra and kalasha in the veneration of Devi and linga and Baneshvara shilas in the veenration of Shiva. The Pranatoshani Tantra  states that worship of all deities can be conducted on a shaligrama shila. The Puranas unequivocally state that worship of Vishnu done through a shaligrama shila yields greater merit than that done through a murti (idol).

Unlike murtis, shaligrama shilas can be worshipped in individual residencies alongside temples, can be carried away from one place to another easily and can be worshipped as long as the chakra inside it has not been broken or cracked. Hence worship of shaligrama shila can be afforded by people even in times of hardship and distress as the only mode of worship.

Hindus hailing from South India bedeck idols of Vishnu with a garland made of 108 shaligrama shilas. Bengali Hindus observe a ceremony called Svastyayana in which 108 or 1008 tulasi leaves anointed with sandalwood paste are offered on a shaligrama shila with the aim of healing diseases or being delivered from troubles. This can be accompanied by Chandipatha (ritualistic recitation of the Devi Mahatmya) once, thrice or five times; worshipping one or four clay Shivalingas and chanting the mantras of Durga and Vishnu 108 or 1008 times.

On February 2, 2023 a shaligram rock from Nepal was brought to Ayodhya in India, where it will be hewn to form the main deity in the under-construction Ram Temple.

Literature

The Pranatoshani Tantra states that: 
The merit gained by worshipping Vishnu in a Shalagrama shila once is equivalent to that of conducting a thousand Rajasuya yajnas and donating the entire earth.
A person who is unable to undertake pilgrimage, donate articles to the needy and brahmins or conduct yajnas can gain mukti (liberation) by worshipping Vishnu in a Shalagrama shila.
Land situated within the radius of three yojanas of a Shalagrama shila becomes sacred to Vishnu even if that land is inhabited by mlecchas (non-Hindus). A devout worshipper who dies in such an area is never reborn again.
All sorts of auspicious activities (like taking ablution, donating articles to the needy and brahmins, undergoing austerities and conducting homa) grants merit for all eternity on being conducted in the vicinity of a Shalagrama shila.
All sorts of sins whether perceived in mind or committed in deeds for an entire year are destroyed by donating a Shalagrama shila to a brahmin.
The person who worships together 12 Shalagrama shilas for a single day earns the merit equivalent of worshipping 12 crore Shivalingas with lotuses made out of gold and residing in Varanasi for eight days.
The person who worships together 100 Shalagrama shilas attains Maharloka after death and is reborn as an emperor.
Moksha is undoubtedly obtained by the person who worships a Shalagrama shila and Dvaravati shila together. 

The material is also mentioned in the Skanda Purana and Padma Purana.

Restrictions

The Pranatoshani Tantra states that nobody except initiated brahmins are allowed to touch a Shalagrama shila. On being touched by somebody other than an initiated brahmin, the Shalagrama shila must be cleansed with panchagavya. However all persons are allowed to be the yajamana for the worship of a Shalagrama shila.
 The Padma Purana, Patala Khanda, Chapter 20 prohibits women of all castes from touching a Shalagrama shila both directly (by anointing sandalwood paste) and indirectly (by offering flowers).
The Padma Purana, Patala Khanda, Chapter 79 states that person who buys and sells Shalagrama shilas is damned in hell as long as the sun exists in the sky. The same fate is destined for the person who approves of buying or selling Shalagrama shilas and the person who determines its monetary value.
The Devi Bhagavata Purana, 9th Skandha, Chapter 10 states that the person who places the Shalagrama shila on ground is damned in hell for a hundred Manvantaras where he experiences the pain of being eaten by worms.
The Devi Bhagavata Purana, 9th Skandha, Chapter 24 states that failing to keep one's promise or speaking lies while holding the Shalagrama shila in hand leads the person to be damned in hell for the life-time of Brahma. It also states that the person who removes a tulasi leaf from a Shalagrama shila is separated from his wife in his next birth.
The Devi Bhagavata Purana, 9th Skandha, Chapter 35 states that the person who swears falsely while touching a Shalagrama shila experiences the pain of being burnt in red-hot coal for the lifetime of 14 Indras in hell and is reborn as a worm residing in faeces for seven consecutive births.

References

Forms of Vishnu
Vaishnavism
Hindu iconography
Hindu symbols
Objects used in Hindu worship
Fossils